Stayve Jerome Thomas (born September 8, 1980), better known by his stage name Slim Thug, is an American rapper. He initially gained mainstream attention for his contribution to the hit single by rapper Mike Jones, "Still Tippin'". In July 2005, he released his debut album Already Platinum, which reached number two on the Billboard 200 chart. That same year, he was featured on fellow Houston artist Beyoncé's 2005 single "Check on It" (alongside Bun B), which reached number one on the Billboard Hot 100, and won the MTV Video Music Award for Best R&B Video.

Early life
At age 17, he performed freestyle raps at local high school parties. He began his rap career with Swishahouse in the late 1990s. After realizing how much money he could make distributing his own mixtapes, he parted ways with Swishahouse on good terms and formed his own independent label, Boss Hogg Outlawz. Thomas bought two record stores and worked in real estate. Stayve attended Eisenhower High School.

Music career

Already Platinum (2005–08)
Slim Thug's big debut album with Star Trak Entertainment & Interscope Records, Already Platinum, was released in July 2005 after many delays. It premiered on #2 on the Billboard 200 albums chart and sold 130,000 copies in its first week. Singles included "3 Kings" (featuring T.I. and Bun B), and "I Ain't Heard of That" (featuring Pharrell and Bun B). Slim Thug appeared on Still Tippin' with Mike Jones and Paul Wall, Beyoncé Knowles's #1 single "Check on It" and Gwen Stefani's "Luxurious". With the Boss Hogg Outlawz, Slim Thug released three albums, Boyz N Blue (2004), Serve & Collect (2007) and Back by Blockular Demand: Serve & Collect II (2008). He left Star Trak & Interscope Records in 2008.

Boss of All Bosses (2009)
Slim Thug's second solo album Boss of All Bosses was released in 2009. Although not as successful as his debut album, Boss of All Bosses debuted at #15 on the Billboard 200 with 32,000 copies sold in the first week released. It included the single "I Run".

Tha Thug Show (2010–present)
Slim Thug's third studio album Tha Thug Show. His first single was "Gangsta" which featured Z-Ro. His second single featured rapper/singer B.o.B entitled "So High". It was released November 30, 2010. On April 23, 2013 he released a new EP titled Welcome to Texas EP featuring guest appearances from Rick Ross, Pimp C and Ludacris among others.

In March 2020, Slim Thug released his album Thug Life, and he announced that he had tested positive for COVID-19.

Personal life
According to MTV News, Lupe Fiasco's video for "Hip Hop Saved My Life" was based on Slim Thug's life story. "It is based on Slim Thug," Fiasco revealed.

On June 7, 2010, Vibe released controversial statements Slim Thug had made regarding treatment of black men by black and white women saying "it’s hard to find [a successful black man] so Black women have to bow down and let it be known that they gotta start working hard; they gotta start cooking and being down for they man more. ...White women treat they man like a king."  The article elicited varied reactions from bloggers and online commentators. Cultural critic and Columbia University professor Marc Lamont Hill and singers Aubrey O'Day, D. Woods, and rapper Talib Kweli have all responded publicly to his comments.

Discography
 

Already Platinum (2005)
Boss of All Bosses (2009)
Tha Thug Show (2010)
Boss Life (2013)
Hogg Life: The Beginning (2015)
Hogg Life, Vol. 2: Still Surviving (2015)
Hogg Life, Vol. 3: Hustler of the Year (2015)
Hogg Life, Vol. 4: American King (2016)
Welcome 2 Houston (2017)
The World Is Yours (2017)
Suga Daddy Slim: On tha Prowl (2019)
Thug Life (2020)
Down in Texas (2020) (with Killa Kyleon)
SDS Vibes (2021)
BIGslim (2022)
Where Dreams Are Made (2023)

Awards and nominations
MTV Video Music Awards

References

External links

African-American male rappers
Rappers from Houston
Southern hip hop musicians
1980 births
Living people
African-American businesspeople
American music industry executives
American real estate businesspeople
Gangsta rappers
Snap music
MNRK Music Group artists
Interscope Records artists
Businesspeople from Houston
21st-century American rappers
21st-century American male musicians
21st-century African-American musicians
20th-century African-American people